Lieutenant General Upendra Dwivedi, AVSM is a serving general officer of the Indian Army. He currently serves as the General Officer Commanding-in-Chief Northern Command. He assumed the post upon the superannuation of Lieutenant General Yogesh Kumar Joshi. He previously served as the Deputy Chief of the Army Staff (Information Systems and Coordination) and as the General officer commanding IX Corps.

Career 
A Sainik School Rewa and National Defence Academy, Khadakwasla alumnus, Dwivedi was commissioned into the 18th battalion of the Jammu and Kashmir Rifles on 15 December 1984 from Indian Military Academy, Dehradun. He commanded a battalion at Chowkibal during Operation Rakshak, a sector of the Assam Rifles in Manipur during Operation Rhino, and served in Assam as inspector general, Assam Rifles.

Among his previous appointments were as an instructor at the Indian Military Academy, directing staff at the higher command wing in the Army War College, military attaché to the government of Seychelles and as director-general of infantry. He was appointed commander of IX Corps in February 2020, and as Deputy Chief of the Army Staff (Information Systems and Coordination) in April 2021.

Awards and decorations

Dates of rank

References 

Living people
Indian generals
Recipients of the Ati Vishisht Seva Medal
Indian Army officers
Year of birth missing (living people)
National Defence Academy (India) alumni
Indian military attachés